Mapimí is a city and municipal seat of the Mapimí Municipality in the Mexican state of Durango. As of 2015, the town of Mapimí had a population of 5,623.

History
When the Spanish first arrived in the Mapimí area in the late 16th century, nomadic and semi-nomadic Native Americans such as the Tepehuan, Tobosos, and Cocoyones were the inhabitants.   Mapimi was founded on July 25, 1598 by Agustin de Espinoza, a Jesuit priest, and Captain Antón de Zapata, a soldier.  The settlement was named Santiago de Mapimí. The name derives from the Cocoyones who called the area "Mapeme," meaning "high mountain." As with most early settlements in Northern Mexico, the abundant minerals in the area were the attraction for settlers.

The Toboso and other Indian groups began raiding in the Mapimí area and participated in wars against Spanish settlements in 1644, 1667, and 1684.  Most of the Indians were absorbed into the Spanish population in the 18th century.

Geography

Mapimí is located in the Bolsón de Mapimí, a large area of desert and mountains in interior northern Mexico. The Bolsón is an endorheic basin, meaning that no rivers leave the basin to flow to the sea, but terminate, often in low-lying shallow endorheic lakes. The Ojuela mine and the Ojuela Bridge, a high and long suspension bridge are located  distant on the eastern slopes of the mountains.

Climate
The town features a desert climate (in the Köppen climate classification BWh), with hot summers and mild winters. Nearly all the annual precipitation is received from the months of May to October.

See also
Mapimí Silent Zone, an alleged area of radio silence located in the region.

References

External links
Municipality of Mapimí (on official site of the State of Durango)

Populated places in Durango
Populated places established in 1598
Pueblos Mágicos